Brownsword is a surname. Notable people with the surname include:

Andrew Brownsword (born 1947), English businessman
Jack Brownsword (1923–2009), English footballer
Tyler Brownsword (born 1999), English footballer